Antonio Justo Alcíbar (born 30 December 1944) is a retired Argentine football player who played for Olympiacos in the 1972–73 season.

Alcíbar also played in the Spanish second division with C.D. San Andrés during the 1974–75 season.

References

External links
 Antonio Justo Alcibar at BDFA.com.ar 

1944 births
Living people
Argentine expatriate footballers
Argentine footballers
Newell's Old Boys footballers
Nueva Chicago footballers
Racing Club de Avellaneda footballers
Olympiacos F.C. players
UE Sant Andreu footballers
Club Atlético Sarmiento footballers
Expatriate footballers in Greece

Association football forwards